Samuel Stephen Brannan (February 5, 1835April 5, 1880) was an American newspaper editor, Republican politician, and Wisconsin pioneer.  He was the 13th mayor of Portage, Wisconsin, and represented northern Columbia County in the Wisconsin State Assembly during the 1873 session.

Biography

Born in Silver Creek, New York, Brannan moved with his parents to Wisconsin in 1849 and settled in Portage, Wisconsin in 1850. He was one of the owners of the Portage Daily Register, and he founded the Wisconsin State Register in 1860. He served on the Columbia County, Wisconsin Board of Supervisors, the Portage Common Council, and was city marshal.  Brannan served as Mayor of Portage in 1872 and 1873. He then served in the Wisconsin State Assembly in 1873 as a Republican. Then, Brannan served as postmaster of Portage, Wisconsin until his death. He died of tuberculosis in Portage, Wisconsin.

References

1835 births
1880 deaths
People from Silver Creek, New York
People from Portage, Wisconsin
Editors of Wisconsin newspapers
County supervisors in Wisconsin
Wisconsin city council members
Mayors of places in Wisconsin
Republican Party members of the Wisconsin State Assembly
19th-century American journalists
American male journalists
19th-century American male writers
19th-century American politicians